"Walking in My Sleep" is a song written by Leslie Adey and Jack Green and recorded by English singer Roger Daltrey for his fifth solo studio album Parting Should Be Painless (1984). The single was produced by Mike Thorne, with executive producer listed as "Spike". This is presumably the same woman who was credited as executive producer of Pete Townshend's compilation album Scoop (1983), later revealed to be Helen Wilkins.

The single, "Walking in My Sleep", peaked at number 4 on the Billboards Mainstream Rock Charts and number 40 on the Netherlands's MegaCharts the single also reached No. 56 on the UK singles charts and No. 62 on the US singles charts and No. 19 on the Austrian Singles Charts.

The single's music video featured Ian Dury, who was best known as the lead singer of the British band Ian Dury and the Blockheads.

Track listing
 12" Single (U 9686 (T))
"Walking in My Sleep" – 3:20
"Somebody Told Me" – 3:10
"Gimme Some Lovin'" – 3:45

 7" Single (U 9686, U9686) 
"Walking in My Sleep" – 3:20
"Somebody Told Me" – 3:10

Personnel
 Roger Daltrey – lead vocals
 Michael Brecker – tenor saxophone
 Chris Spedding – lead guitar
 Mick Gallagher – keyboards
 Billy Nicholls – backing vocals
 Allan Schwartzberg – drums
 Mike Thorne – synthesizers
 Norman Watt-Roy – bass guitar

See also
Roger Daltrey discography

References

External links

1984 singles
1984 songs
Atlantic Records singles
Warner Music Group singles
Song recordings produced by Mike Thorne